Tony Grindberg (born December 21, 1960) is an American politician who served in the North Dakota Senate from the 41st district from 1992 to 2014. Tony Grindberg was elected to the Fargo City Commission in June 2016.

Personal life
Grindberg's stepson, Thomas Beadle, served as a member of the South Dakota House of Representatives.

References

1960 births
Living people
Republican Party North Dakota state senators